Optivus agrammus, the western roughy, is a member of the family Trachichthyidae. Its name, "Optivus agrammus," comes from Latin: "Optivus" means "chosen"; and Greek: "agrammus" refers to the lack of stripes on its caudal fin.

References

External links
 Fishes of Australia : Optivus agrammus

western roughy
Vertebrates of Western Australia
Fauna of South Australia
western roughy